The Diocese of Acerra is a Roman Catholic ecclesiastical territory in Campania, southern Italy, eight miles east of Naples, in the area once called Terra Laboris (Liburia). It has existed since the 11th century. It is a suffragan of the Archdiocese of Naples.

The diocese has one priest for every 2,436 Catholics.

History of the diocese

The cathedral of Acerra was originally dedicated to Saint Michael the Archangel.

The cathedral was administered and served by a Chapter, composed of three dignities (the Archpriest, the Cantor, and the Primicerius) and fifteen Canons.

In 1818, a new concordat with the Kingdom of the Two Sicilies committed the pope to the suppression of more than fifty small dioceses in the kingdom. The ecclesiastical province of Naples was spared from any suppressions, but the diocese of Sant' Agata de' Goti, which had not had a bishop in two decades, and the diocese of Acerra, which was very small in territory, population, and income, came under scrutiny. Pope Pius VII, in the bull "De Utiliori" of 27 June 1818, chose to unite the two dioceses under the leadership of one bishop, aeque principaliter.  In the same concordat, the King was confirmed in the right to nominate candidates for vacant bishoprics, subject to the approval of the pope. That situation persisted down until the final overthrow of the Bourbon monarchy in 1860.

In a bull of 30 November 1854, Pope Pius IX separated the diocese of Acerra and the diocese of S. Agata de' Goti, which had been joined under one bishop since 1818. In the bull, Pope Pius also transferred four communes from S. Agata to Acerra: Arienzo, San Felice, S. Maria a Vico, and Cervino and the farm of Forchia.

Along with the separation of the two dioceses and the redrawing of diocesan boundaries, Pope Pius granted the diocese of Acerra the use of the former Dominican house in S. Maria a Vico for its seminary. The new seminary had its formal inauguration on 15 June 1857.

Bishops of Acerra

Through 1500
 
...
Girardo (attested 1098, 1114)
Ignotus (attested 1139)
...
Bartolomeo (attested 1179)
...
Romanus (12th cent.)
...
Gentile (1242–?)
...
Tommaso (1284–1302)
...
Gentile (1307–1308)
Guglielmo (attested 1310)
? Giovanni D'Esertelle, O. Cist. (1316– ? )
? Spanus (attested 1325)
[Pietro, O.F.M. (1331)]
Filippo (1331 Died)
Giovanni, O.F.M. (1332–1342)
Matteo di Castelpietro, O.F.M. (1342–1344)
Enrico da Monte (Henricus de Monte), O.P. (1344–1348)
Ranieri (Raynerius) (1348–1354)
Federico (1356–1362)
Giovanni (1363–1394)
? Benedetto da Ascoli, O.E.S.A. (?–1389 Died) Avignon Obedience?
Tommaso (1394–1403)
Angelo de Consilio (Angelo de Conciliis) (1403–1429 Died).
Filippo (1429–1434)
Nicola de Utino, O.P. (1434–1439 Died)
Nicola Descari (1439–1451)
Bertrando (1451–1452)
Leone Cortese (1452–1496 Died)
Roberto de Noya (Noja), O.P. (1497–1504)

1500 to 1700

1700 to present

Notes and references

Bibliography

Reference works
 p. 844-845. (Use with caution; obsolete)

Studies

Kehr, Paul Fridolin (1925). Italia pontificia Vol. VIII (Berlin: Weidmann 1925), pp. 476–477.

External links
 Diocese of Acerra, Official page

Acerra
Acerra